D. gouldii may refer to:
 Dendrobium gouldii, an orchid species in the genus Dendrobium
 Dentalium gouldii, the Gould tuskshell, a mollusc species
 Donax gouldii, the bean clam, a species found on the Pacific coast of North America

See also
 Gouldii (disambiguation)